Nasser Talla Dahilan (born 1978) was an International Iraqi former football, who play with Iraq national football team in 2004 AFC Asian Cup qualification, he is currently working as coach for Al-Bahri club.

Managerial statistics

Honors

Club
Al-Minaa
Iraqi Premier League runner-up: 2004–05
Peace and Friendship Cup: 2004

References

External links
 
 Nasser Tallaa at Dsg-widgets.com
 Nasser Tallaa at Goal.com

1978 births
Iraqi footballers
Iraq international footballers
Association football forwards
Living people
Basra
People from Basra
Sportspeople from Basra
Al-Mina'a SC players
Al-Zawraa SC players
Erbil SC players